The columbiad was a large-caliber, smoothbore, muzzle-loading cannon able to fire heavy projectiles at both high and low trajectories. This feature enabled the columbiad to fire solid shot or shell to long ranges, making it an excellent seacoast defense weapon for its day.  Invented by Colonel George Bomford, United States Army, in 1811, columbiads were used in United States seacoast defense from the War of 1812 until the early years of the 20th century. Very few columbiads were used outside of the U.S. and Confederate Armies; nevertheless, the columbiad is considered by some as the inspiration for the later shell-only cannons developed by Frenchman Henri-Joseph Paixhans some 30 years later.

History

The first columbiads produced in 1811 had a  diameter bore and fired a fifty-pound projectile. Although some Second System forts were armed with this weapon, the Army did not widely adopt early columbiads due to initial high costs of manufacture. Only after 1844 did an eight-inch (203 mm) model and a ten-inch (254 mm) model see mass production. These cast-iron weapons were typically mounted on seacoast carriages designed to recoil up a slightly inclined set of "rails" or wooden beams. The mounted columbiad could pivot left or right on a traversing rail. In most cases the arc of pivot was less than 180 degrees, but some batteries allowed 360-degree traverse.

Just prior to the American Civil War, Ordnance Corps officer Thomas Jackson Rodman developed an improved version of the columbiad, which became known by his name. Specifically the Rodman gun was designed to reduce cracking and other weaknesses found in such large iron castings. The process involved ensured the iron cooled evenly from the inside out, and resulted in what we might call today a "soda bottle" shaped casting with smooth, tapered exterior. The "Rodman" process also allowed the manufacture of much larger bore columbiads.

Between 1858 and the end of the Civil War, Northern foundries produced eight-inch (203 mm), ten-inch (254 mm), fifteen-inch (381 mm) and twenty-inch Rodman style columbiads. Very few of the largest types were built, and none were fired in anger during the war. Sling carts were used to transport these guns to the forts where they were emplaced in gun carriages.

The Confederate States also used columbiads extensively, mostly stocks captured from Federal arsenals at the time of secession. These acquitted themselves well against early ironclad warships. In addition, the Confederates produced limited quantities of eight-inch (203 mm) and ten-inch (254 mm) columbiads without the Rodman process; these could not withstand sustained use. The Confederates also rifled some columbiads in an effort to improve weapon performance.

After the Civil War, many columbiads remained in place at seacoast fortifications around the U.S. In the late 1870s several were rifled and tested for use against modern steel-clad ships, with poor results. Strapped for funding, the post-war army continued to carry smooth-bore columbiads on inventory lists until after the Spanish–American War, when modern breech-loading rifled cannon replaced them.

Many columbiads are on display at Federal and state parks, "guarding" courthouses around the United States, as well as in city parks with accompanying historical markers, commemorating the 19th-century seacoast fortifications.

In fiction

In Jules Verne's 1865 novel From the Earth to the Moon, a giant columbiad space gun is constructed in Tampa, Florida after the American Civil War, with the purpose of striking the Moon. Although the cannon is originally designed to fire a hollow aluminum ball, a bullet-shaped projectile is later designed with the purpose of carrying people.

It weighs more than 68,000 short tons (61,700 metric tons or 60,700 long tons) and is therefore cast directly in the ground, rather than being mounted on rails.

A vastly scaled-down depiction of this fictional cannon was built as a launch cannon for the French version of Space Mountain at Disneyland Paris. Originally named "Space Mountain: De la Terre à la Lune", the ride was loosely based on Verne's novel, and the attraction's exterior was built using a Verne-era retro-futuristic influence.

Gallery

See also
 Seacoast defense in the United States
 Dahlgren gun – US Navy equivalent of columbiads

References

Further reading

External links
 Columbiad historical marker

Coastal artillery
American Civil War artillery
Cannon
203 mm artillery